Wiley and Elizabeth Forbus House is a historic home located at Durham, Durham County, North Carolina.  It was built between 1931 and 1933, and is a two-story, Norman Provincial style brick dwelling. It consists of a central hip-roofed block flanked by side gabled wings.  It features a two-story tower with conical roof on the main block.

It was listed on the National Register of Historic Places in 2005.  It is located in the Hope Valley Historic District.

References

Houses on the National Register of Historic Places in North Carolina
Houses completed in 1933
Houses in Durham, North Carolina
National Register of Historic Places in Durham County, North Carolina
Individually listed contributing properties to historic districts on the National Register in North Carolina